Adam Rankin Alexander (November 1, 1781 – November 1, 1848) was an American slave owner and politician who represented Tennessee in the United States House of Representatives.

Biography

Alexander was born in Rockbridge County, Virginia on November 1, 1781 to Oliver and Mary ( Craig) Alexander. Educator Eben Alexander was his grandson.

Career
During the War of 1812, Alexander served from October 4, 1813, to January 4, 1814. He served as a private in Captain William Dooley's Company; and as a Lieutenant and Quartermaster in Thomas McCrory's 2nd Regiment, West Tennessee Militia. 

He married Leah Reagan, a Virginia native, on March 26, 1805, in Blount County, Tennessee.

Alexander worked as a surveyor, and afterwards, he was the register of the land office for the tenth surveyors' district in Madison County, Tennessee. He was a member of the court of Madison County in 1821. He became a member of the Tennessee Senate in 1817.

Elected as a Jacksonian Republican to the Eighteenth and as a Jacksonian to the succeeding Congress, Alexander served as a U.S. Representative from March 4, 1823, to March 3, 1827. He was an unsuccessful candidate for re-election to the Twentieth Congress in 1827, and lost his seat to frontiersman Davy Crockett.

Alexander represented Shelby County, Tennessee, at the Tennessee constitutional convention in 1834. He was a member of the Tennessee House of Representatives in 1841 and 1843.

Death
Alexander died on November 1, 1848, aged 67, in Marshall County, Mississippi. He is interred at Alexander-Pryor Family Cemetery, Laws Hill, Marshall County, Mississippi.

References

External links

1781 births
1848 deaths
People from Rockbridge County, Virginia
People from Marshall County, Mississippi
People from Madison County, Tennessee
People from Shelby County, Tennessee
American people of Scotch-Irish descent
Democratic-Republican Party members of the United States House of Representatives from Tennessee
Jacksonian members of the United States House of Representatives from Tennessee
Tennessee state senators
Members of the Tennessee House of Representatives
American slave owners